Parabouchetia is a poorly known, monotypic genus endemic to Brazil, belonging (most probably) to the nightshade family Solanaceae. The single species, Parabouchetia brasiliensis is (in the words of the late Professor Armando Theodoro Hunziker) an herbaceous plant of 'astounding rarity' - the type specimen (held in the herbarium of the National Museum of Natural History (France) in Paris ), being the only one ever collected. This was discovered on 26 October 1828 by English explorer and naturalist William John Burchell of Fulham, growing in a location in central Brazil between São Bento and Rio Cangalho in the state of Goiás (near the junction of parallel 12 degrees S. and meridian 47 degrees W.), towards the NNE of Brasília. 

The generic name Parabouchetia is derived from that of the Solanaceous genus Bouchetia (the prefix 'Para-' signifying 'like' or 'near to') - from the superficial similarity in appearance between the solitary species of the former and the two species of the latter, namely Bouchetia erecta of Texas and Central America and the closely related Bouchetia anomala of South America. 
There is also a genus Bouchetia in the animal kingdom. 

Parabouchetia brasiliensis is a slender herb with small narrow leaves and bearing small flowers.

References

Solanaceae
Monotypic Solanaceae genera
Endemic flora of Brazil